The 2011 Strabag Prague Open was a professional tennis tournament played on clay courts. It was the 18th edition of the men's tournament which was part of the 2011 ATP Challenger Tour and the 10th edition of the women's tournament, part of 2011 ITF Women's Circuit. It was part of the WTA Tour in the previous year, but was degraded to ITF event this year. It took place in Prague, Czech Republic between 2 and 8 May 2011.

The tournament included tennis exhibition involving Karolína Plíšková, Kristýna Plíšková and Martina Hingis and Daja Bedanova.

ATP entrants

Seeds

 Rankings are as of April 25, 2011.

Other entrants
The following players received wildcards into the singles main draw:
  Jan Blecha
  Tiago Fernandes
  Fernando González
  Jiří Veselý

The following players received entry as a special exempt into the singles main draw:
  Ádám Kellner
  Stéphane Robert

The following players received entry from the qualifying draw:
  Dennis Blömke
  Aliaksandr Bury
  Nicolas Devilder
  James Lemke

WTA entrants

Seeds

 Rankings are as of April 25, 2011.

Other entrants
The following players received wildcards into the singles main draw:
  Gesa Focke
  Tereza Hejlová
  Karolína Plíšková
  Krystina Plíšková

The following players received entry from the qualifying draw:
  Jana Čepelová
  Lenka Juríková
  Paula Ormaechea
  Arina Rodionova

The following players received entry as a lucky loser:
  Ana Clara Duarte

Finals

Men's singles

 Lukáš Rosol  defeated  Alex Bogomolov Jr., 7–6(7–1), 5–2 retired

Women's singles

 Lucie Hradecká defeated  Paula Ormaechea, 4–6, 6–3, 6–2

Men's doubles

 František Čermák /  Lukáš Rosol defeated  Christopher Kas /  Alexander Peya, 6–3, 6–4

Women's doubles

 Darya Kustova /  Arina Rodionova defeated  Olga Savchuk /  Lesia Tsurenko, 2–6, 6–1, [10–7]

External links
 Official website
 ITF Search
 ATP official site

Strabag Prague Open
Strabag Prague Open
Clay court tennis tournaments
Tennis tournaments in the Czech Republic
2011
2011 in Czech tennis
May 2011 sports events in Europe